Lycaena editha, known generally as the Edith's copper or great gray copper, is a species of copper in the butterfly family Lycaenidae. It is found in North America.

The MONA or Hodges number for Lycaena editha is 4254.

Subspecies
These six subspecies belong to the species Lycaena editha:
 Lycaena editha editha (Mead, 1878)
 Lycaena editha montana Field, 1936
 Lycaena editha obscuramaculata Austin, 1989
 Lycaena editha pseudonexa J. Emmel & Pratt in T. Emmel, 1998
 Lycaena editha vanduzeei Gunder, 1927
 Lycaena editha vurali Koçak, 1984

References

Further reading

External links

 

Lycaena
Articles created by Qbugbot
Butterflies described in 1878